Stylida (older Στυλίς, Stylis) is a town and a municipality in Phthiotis, Greece. The population of the municipal unit was 6,126 (2011).

History 
First mention of the town of Stylida was during ancient times when the town was named Phalara. The town has many ancient buildings and artifacts, such as the wall near the church of Agia Ekaterini, the tombs located near Karkali street and a mosaic under the Eleftheriou Venizelou street.

Municipality 
The municipality Stylida was formed at the 2011 local government reform by the merger of the following 3 former municipalities, that became municipal units:
Echinaioi
Pelasgia
Stylida

The municipality has an area of 463.863 km2, the municipal unit 202.477 km2.

Geography

The port town Stylida is situated on the northern shore of the Malian Gulf, and at the southern foot of Mount Othrys, It is 17 km east of Lamia, the capital of Phthiotis.

Transport
The town is served by rail links to Central Greece via Leianokladi–Stylida branch line. The Greek National Road 1 passes through the town.

Twin towns 
 Amelia, Italy, since 2002

References

External links
 Municipality of Stylida 

Municipalities of Central Greece
Populated places in Phthiotis